The CZ 805 BREN is a gas-operated modular assault rifle designed and manufactured by Česká zbrojovka Uherský Brod. The modular design enables users to change the calibre of the weapon to 5.56×45mm NATO or 7.62×39mm intermediate cartridges by quick change of barrel with gas tubes, breech block, magazine bay and magazine.

The CZ 805 BREN was created to replace the Sa vz. 58 in the Czech Army in 2006, which later sprung a family of rifles; CZ 807, CZ BREN 2, CZ BREN 2 BR and CZ BREN 2 PPS.

The CZ 805 BREN is used by various police and military forces, including in the Czech Republic, Indonesia, and Mexico.

History
Czechoslovakia had the distinction of being the only Warsaw Pact member whose army did not issue a rifle based on the Soviet AK-47/AKM. They developed the Sa Vz. 58 in the late 1950s and although it fired the same 7.62×39mm cartridge and externally looked similar, its operating system and features were dramatically different. It was effective at the time it was introduced, but by the next decade was obsolescent and hard to modify.

In 1977, the Brno General Machine-Building Plants R&D Center began a program to create a new rifle under the name Lada S. A design was approved in 1984 that fired the smaller 5.45×39mm cartridge and could fill three roles: a subcarbine with a  barrel; a rifle with a  barrel; and a light support weapon with a  barrel. They followed the variant family of AK-74 rifles and mostly took after their designs except for differences in the receiver cover, sights, and safety selector. The weapons were built by late 1985, tested starting in 1986, and was approved for production in November 1989. Shortly after that time however, the Cold War was ending and Czechoslovakia's communist party had stepped down following the Velvet Revolution. 300,000 Lada systems were planned, but by the time it was declared fit for production in February 1990, the Army had no funds. The country itself was splitting apart, and on 1 January 1993 it separated into the Czech Republic and Slovakia, ending 74 years of the country of Czechoslovakia. The Lada was not likely to be bought in large numbers by the smaller army. By then Česká zbrojovka Uherský Brod, which had taken over the design, had become privatised, and the company shelved the weapon for several years.

In the late 1990s, the Lada project was restarted with the prospect of the Czech Republic becoming a full member of NATO. It had been converted to fire .223 Remington ammunition shortly before it was shelved, mainly because the program did not involve producing 5.45×39mm ammunition and Sellier & Bellot was already producing .223 cartridges. The restarted rifle program rechambered the rifle to NATO standard 5.56×45mm ammunition, but retained a magazine well that accepted AK-74-type magazines. Converting it to accept STANAG magazines would have required the receiver to be redesigned and to have cost too much. The Army of the Czech Republic was interested in acquiring a new rifle but did not award any contracts. The Lada was then offered for export under the name CZ 2000.

In 2014, the Slovak Army began to replace its vz. 58 rifles with the CZ 805 BREN. In November 2016, the Czech Army received its first batch of CZ BREN 2 modular assault rifles. In 2017, French GIGN received 68 CZ BREN 2 assault rifles chambered in 7.62×39mm and is expected to order more, in order to replace most of its Heckler & Koch HK416. The CZ BREN 2 in 7.62×39mm was also issued to Egyptian airborne forces and Republican Guard in 2017 and 2018 respectively.

Project 805

For the domestic Army Replacement Rifle program development, the Lada was re-designated Project 805. The Army still did not wish to buy a new rifle for the entire military, but special forces did receive Bushmaster M4A3 carbines. With the prospect that the Army would re-arm gradually rather than on a large scale, CZUB drew up entirely new specifications in late 2005. Project 805 became the CZ XX, and then the CZ S805.

Two types of guns were drawn up: 'A' models chambered for intermediate rounds including 5.56×45mm NATO, 7.62×39mm, and 6.8mm Remington SPC; and 'B' models chambered for rifle rounds like 7.62×51mm NATO and even .300 Winchester Magnum.

All had three barrel lengths to act as a rifle, close quarters carbine, and designated marksman rifle/LSW. A CZ S805 was presented to the Army chief of staff in November 2006, but still was not ordered. CZUB then presented the weapon publicly and spent three years showing it at exhibitions. It wasn't until November 2009 that the Czech Army finally released a tender for a new infantry rifle.

The company reduced its modularity for the competition and submitted a 5.56 mm rifle (A1) and 5.56 mm carbine (A2), as well as similarly configured 7.62 Soviet-chambered guns. This was eventually reduced to just the 5.56 mm system. When the tender was released, 27 weapons were submitted, but were reduced to just the CZ 805 and FN SCAR-L. The CZ 805 won narrowly from emphasis on a domestic design and the result was made public on 1 February 2010. FN Herstal did not contest the decision, and the CZ 805 was officially ordered on 18 March 2010: 6,687 CZ 805 BREN A1 assault rifles; 1,250 CZ 805 BREN A2 carbines; and 397 CZ 805 G1 proprietary grenade launchers. Each one was equipped with Meopta ZD-Dot red dot sights and iron sights. For special forces, 1,386 enhanced optical suites consisting of Meopta's DV-Mag3 daylight 3× magnifier, NV-3Mag night 3× magnifier, and a DBAL-A2 (AN/PEQ-15A) laser target designator were also ordered.

In May 2010, the Army requested changes to the design before it could be operational including the change from a folding and telescoping stock to just a folding one, a pin-stabilised magazine well, a pistol grip with changeable backstraps, and the change from a 7-lug bolt to a 6-lug bolt. The first delivery of the CZ 805 occurred on 19 July 2011 with 505 guns and 20 grenade launchers. The initial order was to be completed in 2013.

Project 806
In October 2015, CZUB announced that it had introduced an improved, lighter variant of its CZ 805 BREN rifle called CZ BREN 2 (also unofficially CZ 806 BREN 2) with significantly improved ergonomics and functionality. In January 2016 the Czech Army confirmed that they had signed contracts with CZUB for 2,600  CZ BREN 2 rifles and 800 CZ 805 G1 underbarrel grenade launchers. The decision about the purchase had been taken in late October 2015 under an urgent requirement procedure because of new security threat and the migration crisis within Europe and Egypt.

Design
The CZ 805 BREN utilizes a locked breech with rotating breech block  driven by combustion gases tapped from the barrel and features a manual gas regulator.

The CZ 805 BREN assault rifle is fitted with folding iron sights, but also includes an integral Picatinny rail on top of the receiver and is capable of accepting a wide variety of additional sighting equipment (red-dot or telescope day sights, night sights, lasers etc.). The weapon is equipped with side-folding buttstock, which is adjustable for length of pull, and can be completely removed if maximum compactness is required. Additional equipment also includes a new, specially designed 40 mm underbarrel grenade launcher and a bayonet.

The fire control unit includes a ambidextrous safety/fire selector switch, which permits semi-automatic, 2-round bursts and full automatic fire.

The charging handle can also be installed on either side of the weapon, depending on user preferences. The CZ 805 BREN has two barrel lengths. A 360 mm (14.2 inch) barrel length for the standard assault rifle variant, the CZ 805 BREN A1 and a 277 mm (10.9 inch) barrel for the carbine variant, the CZ 805 BREN A2. The barrel is chrome-lined for accuracy and durability.

The rifle features a separate detachable magazine housing which can be replaced easily to allow the use of STANAG or HK G36 5.56×45mm NATO magazines. It is also capable of housing a 5.56×45mm NATO 100-round Beta C-Mag. In standard configuration, the CZ 805 BREN uses a 5.56×45mm NATO proprietary 30-round magazine made of transparent polymer made by CZUB.

Variants

CZ 805 BREN 

 The CZ 805 BREN A1 is the standard assault rifle configuration chambered in 5.56×45mm NATO cartridge with a barrel length of 360 mm (14.2 inch).
 The CZ 805 BREN A2 is the carbine configuration chambered in 5.56×45mm NATO cartridge with a barrel length of 277 mm (10.9 inch).
 The CZ 805 BREN S1 is a semi-automatic only variant of the CZ 805 BREN which is intended for the civilian market. It has been discontinued in favour for the CZ BREN 2 Ms, which is a semi-automatic only variant of the CZ BREN 2.

CZ 807 
The CZ 807 is an assault rifle chambered in 7.62×39mm cartridge and has the ability to quickly change calibre to 5.56×45mm NATO cartridge by replacing the magazine well module and swapping out the barrel.

CZ BREN 2 
The CZ BREN 2 is a modular assault rifle that improves upon the original CZ 805 BREN design based on the experience of users .

The rifle can be chambered in either 5.56×45mm NATO or 7.62×39mm cartridge. Switching the caliber of the rifle can be done by swapping out the barrel and mag well. CZ offers three different barrel lengths for the two calibers, ranging from 207 mm (8 in) for the 5.56×45mm and 227 mm (9 in) for the 7.62×39mm, 280 mm (11 in), and 357 mm (14 in). It features a fully ambidextrous fire selector, magazine release, bolt release and charging handle. It has a simplified trigger system with three positions for "safe", "semi-auto" and "full-auto". The cyclic rate of fire is around 850 (±100) rounds per minute. The "2-round burst" firing mode of the CZ 805 BREN was abandoned. Disassembly and assembly for routine maintenance can be carried out without the need for any tools. The rifle has a lower weight. The materials that are used to build the rifle are non-combustible as well as being resistant to impacts and mechanical damage.

The CZ BREN 2 Ms was introduced in 2019. It is a semi-automatic only variant of the CZ BREN 2, intended for the civilian market and has essentially replaced the CZ 805 BREN S1.

CZ BREN 2 BR 

The CZ BREN 2 BR is a gas-operated, select fire battle rifle chambered in 7.62×51 NATO calibre which is derived from the CZ BREN 2. It features a 407 mm (16 in) barrel and feeds from a 25-round magazine.

CZ BREN 2 PPS 
The CZ BREN 2 PPS (Czech: Puška pro Přesnou Střelbu, lit. Rifle for Precision Shooting) is a DMR developed from CZ BREN 2 BR. The rifle is using 7.62x51 NATO cartridge, its length is 1300 mm, barrel length 457 mm (18 in), weight 4.6 kg, effective of range 600 – 800 m.

The rifle has replaced SVD Dragunov and SVDN-3 Tiger rifles in selected units of the Czech armed forces.

Users

: Used by Federal law enforcement Agencies.
: 
Beginning in 2011 the Czech Army began replacing vz. 58 with CZ 805 BREN. Since 2015 Czech Army began ordering CZ BREN 2. In 2020, a decision was made that within 5 years Czech Army will be using only CZ BREN 2 as standard issue rifle
Beginning in 2022, CZ BREN 2 PPS has been fielded as designated marksman's rifle, replacing the Dragunov SVD.
 : Egypt has announced that it purchased an unspecified number of CZ 805 BREN A1. The CZ BREN 2 in 7.62×39mm was issued to Egyptian airborne forces and Republican Guard in 2017 and 2018 respectively.
: 68 CZ BREN 2 chambered in 7.62×39mm ordered for the GIGN.
: Hungarian Defence Forces are adopting the CZ BREN 2 assault rifle, replacing the current AK-63D. The rifle and the Scorpion EVO SMG will be also license produced in Hungary.
: Used by Indonesian Navy frogmen (Kopaska)
 : Used by Federal Police since 2014
: CZ BREN 2 used by Portuguese Air Force (NOTP).
: 688 pieces bought by the Slovak Army in November 2014, along with the same number of CZ 75 pistols.
: CZ BREN 2, fielded since 2022, mainly with Ukraine Army units composed of foreign volunteers.   
: CZ 805 BREN A1, CZ 805 BREN A2 use in Military Marksman Demonstration Team.

See also
CZ 807
FN SCAR
FB MSBS Grot
Adaptive Combat Rifle
Beretta ARX160
List of assault rifles

References

External links 
 
 Modern Firearms - CZ 805 BREN
 Ceska Zbrojovka - CZ 805 BREN A2
 Official CZ 805 BREN A1 and A2 Instruction Manual
 Official CZ BREN 2 PDF

Rifles of Czechoslovakia
Carbines
Assault rifles
Battle rifles
Designated marksman rifles
5.56×45mm NATO assault rifles
7.62×39mm assault rifles
7.62×51mm NATO battle rifles
Modular firearms
Short stroke piston firearms
Police weapons
Military equipment introduced in the 2010s